Amy Smith may refer to:

People
Amy Smith (actress), American actress
Amy Smith (cricketer) (born 2004), Australian cricketer
Amy Smith (swimmer) (born 1987), British swimmer
Amy B. Smith (born 1962), lecturer and inventor
Amy C. Smith, American archaeologist
Amy Erica Smith (born 1976), American political scientist
Aimee Smith, candidate in the United States House of Representatives elections in Michigan, 2010

Fictional
Amy Greenwood, married name Smith, on the Australian soap opera Neighbours